Alyaksandr Krasnow (born 14 February 1998) is a Belarusian professional footballer who plays for Rogachev.

References

External links 
 
 

1998 births
Living people
Belarusian footballers
People from Zhodzina
Sportspeople from Minsk Region
Association football forwards
FC Torpedo-BelAZ Zhodino players
FC Smolevichi players
FC Smorgon players
FC Molodechno players
FC Krumkachy Minsk players
FC Dnepr Rogachev players